The first international exhibition of art by female artists opened on December 21, 1976 at a time when the Feminist Art Movement was gaining in support and momentum. The show was curated by Professors Ann Sutherland Harris and Linda Nochlin and included eighty-three artists from twelve countries. The four-city exhibition was organized by the Los Angeles County Museum of Art and was on view there from December 21, 1976 through March 1977. The exhibition went on to show at the University Art Museum in Austin, Texas and then to the Carnegie Museum of Art in Pittsburgh, Pennsylvania, after which it completed its run at the Brooklyn Museum in New York. The Alcoa Foundation and the National Endowment for the Arts provided grants for the exhibition. The show became an important event in the history of art, introducing viewers, who were accustomed to a history of art dominated by men, to the important contributions of women artists.  However, the show consisted almost entirely of white female artists.  The show only included one artist of color, Frida Kahlo, and no black artists.

List of artists
Below is a list of artists in the show.

 Sofonisba Anguissola
 Pauline Auzou
 Fede Galizia 
 Vanessa Bell
 Rosa Bonheur
 Romaine Brooks
 Elizabeth Thompson
 Rosalba Carriera
 Mary Cassatt
 Sonia Delaunay
 Alexandra Exter
 Lavinia Fontana
 Artemisia Gentileschi
 Natalia Goncharova
 Gwen John
 Angelica Kauffman
 Käthe Kollwitz
 Lee Krasner
 Marie Laurencin
 Jeanne-Philiberte Ledoux
 Marie-Victoire Lemoine
 Judith Leyster
 Loren MacIver
 Louise Moillon
 Berthe Morisot
 Alice Neel
 Georgia O'Keeffe
 Liubov Popova
 Olga Rosanova
 Rachel Ruysch
 Elisabetta Sirani
 Florine Stettheimer
 Nadezhda Udaltsova
 Suzanne Valadon
 Anne Vallayer-Coster
 Catharina van Hemessen
 Élisabeth Vigée-Lebrun

Gallery

References

Art exhibitions in the United States
Women artists
1976 in the United States
1977 in the United States